Bellefields is a manor house located in Croom, Prince George's County, Maryland.  It was constructed about 1720. It is a brick structure in Flemish bond with random glazed headers, and two stories over a high basement.  The structure is rectangular, with gabled roof sections, paired interior end chimneys, a front center entrance, wide raised belt course above the first floor, flat arched openings, and flanking symmetrical single-story wings. It is in the Georgian style. It was the home of Patrick Sim, Scottish immigrant and of his son, Col. Joseph Sim, Maryland patriot.

History
Later, sometime after 1849, William Duckett Bowie lived there with his second wife.

It was listed on the National Register of Historic Places in 1974.

On August 31, 2021, three of the farm's 39 zebras escaped from the farm and began wandering around the woods of Upper Marlboro. In September, one of the zebras died in an illegal snare trap. In October, the Maryland Department of the Environment and the Prince George's County Animal Services announced a plan to use two zebras from the herd at Bellefields to lure and corral the zebras back to the farm. Three animal cruelty charges were filed against the farm's owner on October 20. On December 15, the two remaining zebras were captured and returned to the farm.

Notable people
William Williams (c. 1793–1814), born Frederick Hall on the Bellefields Plantation and as an escaped slave enlisted in 38th U.S. Infantry Regiment, U.S. Army dying from his wounds after the British bombardment of Fort McHenry in the War of 1812.

References

External links

, including photo in 1974, at Maryland Historical Trust website

Houses completed in 1720
Historic American Buildings Survey in Maryland
Houses in Prince George's County, Maryland
Houses on the National Register of Historic Places in Maryland
Georgian architecture in Maryland
Scottish-American culture in Maryland
Bowie family
National Register of Historic Places in Prince George's County, Maryland
1720 establishments in the Thirteen Colonies